Leela Chitnis (née Nagarkar; 9 September 1909 – 14 July 2003) was an Indian actress in the Indian film industry, active from  1930s to 1980s. In her early years she starred as a romantic lead, but she is best remembered for her later roles playing a virtuous and upright mother to leading stars.

Early life
She was born in a Marathi-speaking Brahmin family, in Dharwad, Karnataka. Her father was an English literature professor. She was one of the first educated film actresses. After graduation she joined Natyamanwantar, a progressive theater group that produced plays in her native Marathi language. The group's works were greatly influenced by Ibsen, Shaw and Stanislavsky. With the theatre group, Leela played the lead role in a series of comedies and tragedies and even founded her own repertory.

Career
Chitnis' early stage work included comedy Usna Navra (1934) and with her own film group Udyacha Sansar.  She started acting to support her four children. She started as an extra and went on to stunt films.

In Gentleman Daku ("Gentleman Thief") in 1937, Chitnis played a polished crook dressed in male apparel and was publicised in the Times of India as the first graduate society-lady from Maharashtra. By then she had already made her first major mark as an actress on the silver screen. Chitnis worked at Prabhat Pictures, Pune and Ranjit Movietone before going on to be the leading lady in Bombay Talkies.

Specialising in controversial films that challenged accepted societal norms, especially those regarding marriage and the invidious caste system, Bombay Talkies was having limited luck at the box office. But it bounced back with Kangan ("Bangles", 1939), which introduced Chitnis playing the lead role as the adopted daughter of a Hindu priest in love with the son of a local landlord who opposes the relationship and threatens the holy man. Her love, however, stands up to his father's prejudices, an unusual theme for the time, but one that appealed to the public imagination enough to ensure it success at the box office.

With Kangan's success, Leela replaced Bombay Talkies' ravishing leading lady Devika Rani. Leela made a particularly good partner with Devika Rani's leading man Ashok Kumar for a series of box-office hits such as Azad (Free, 1940), Bandhan (Ties, 1940) and Jhoola ("Swing", 1941) that broadly deal with societal issues.. Ashok Kumar was so impressed by her acting abilities that he admitted to having learnt how to speak with his eyes from her. In 1941 Chitnis, at the height of her popularity and glamour, created history of sorts by becoming the first Indian film star to endorse the popular Lux soap brand, a concession then only granted to top Hollywood heroines.

By the mid-1940s her career went downhill as the new leading ladies came in. Leela accepted the reality and in 1948 entered the next, and perhaps most renowned, phase of her career in Shaheed ("Martyr"). Cast as the hero's suffering, ailing mother, she played this role to perfection. For 22 years, Chitnis played the mother of the later leading men including Dilip Kumar, often playing an ailing mother or a mother going through hardships and struggling to bring up her offspring. In fact she created the archetype of the Hindi Film mother, which was continued by later actresses. Leela's maternal histrionics were portrayed in a range of films such as Awaara (The Vagabond, 1951), Ganga Jumna (The Confluence, 1961) and, in 1965, the runaway success Guide, based on the award-winning novel of the same name by R.K. Narayan. She was busy through the 1970s, but cut down her appearances thereafter before taking the final curtain call in Dil Tujhko Diya ("I Give My Heart to You") in 1985. She then emigrated to the United States in the late 1980s to join her children. She died in Danbury, Connecticut at a nursing home, at the age of 94.

Leela also briefly dabbled in movie-making, producing Kisise Na Kehna ("Don't Tell Anybody", 1942) and directing Aaj ki Baat ("The Talk of Today", 1955). She also wrote and directed a stage adaptation of Somerset Maugham's Sacred Flame and published her autobiography, Chanderi Duniyet, in 1981.

Personal life

Chitnis belonged to the Brahmin caste.
However, her father adhered to Brahmo Samaj, a religious movement that rejected caste.

At the age of 15 or 16, she married Dr. Gajanan Yeshwant Chitnis, a gentleman of her own community who was somewhat older than her, in a match arranged by their parents in the usual Indian way. Dr. Chitnis was a qualified medical doctor at a time when this was rare, extremely prestigious and lucrative as a career. The couple were quickly blessed with four children, all boys. They supported India's struggle for independence from Britain and once risked arrest by harbouring M.N.Roy, a famous Marxist freedom fighter, in their house. After she divorced her husband, she worked as a school teacher and began acting on stage in melodramas typical of the time. She even registered as a student in Bombay university and took a degree from there in order to be hired by Bombay Talkies, a major studio of the time; that studio hired only college graduates.

She had four sons Manavendra (Meena), Vijaykumar, Ajitkumar and Raj. She lived with her eldest son in Connecticut in United States, until her death. She had three grandchildren then.

Filmography

Actress

 Shri Satyanarayan (1935)
 Dhuwandhar (1935)
 Chhaya (1936) - Chhaya
 Wahan (1937) - Princess Jayanti
 Insaaf (1937)
 Gentleman Daku (1937)
 Master Man (1938)
 Raja Gopichand (1938)
 Jailor (1938) as Kanwal
 Chhote Sarkar (1938)
 Sant Tulsidas (1939) - Ratnavali
 Kangan (1939) - Radha
 Chhotisi Duniya (1939)
 Ghar Ki Rani (1940) - Arundhati
 Bandhan (1940) - Beena
 Azad (1940)
 Ardhangi (1940) - Arundhati
 Kanchan (1941)
 Jhoola (1941) - Geeta
 Kisise Na Kehna (1942)
 Rekha (1943)
 Manorama (1944)
 Kiran (1944)
 Char Aankhen (1944)
 Shatranj (1946) - Shobharani
 Dev Kanya (1946)
 Bhakta Prahlad
 Ghar Ghar Ki Kahani (1947)
 Andhon Ki Duniya (1947) - Sushila
 Shaheed (1948) - Mrs. Dwarkadas
 Namoona (1949)
 Aakhri Paigham (1949)
 Saudamini (1950)
 Awaara (1951) - Leela Raghunath
 Saiyan (1951) - Rani Sahiba
 Sangdil (1952) - Dhaayi Maa
 Maa (1952) - Bhanu's & Raju's mother
 Naya Ghar (1953)
 Hari Darshan (1953)
 Baadbaan (1954)
 Aaj Ki Baat (1955)
 Funtoosh (1956)
 Basant Bahar (1956) - Gopal's mother
 Aawaz (1956) - Mrs. Bhatnagar
 Naya Daur (1957) - Shankar's Mother
 Sadhna (1958) - Mohan's Mother
 Post Box 999 (1958) - Mrs. Gangadevi (as Lila Chitnis)
 Phil Subha Hogi (1958) - Sohni's Mother (uncredited)
 Dhool Ka Phool (1959) - Gangu Dai
 Ujala (1959) - Ramu's Mother (as Leela Chitnes)
 Main Nashe Mein Hoon (1959) - Mrs. Rajni Khanna
 Kal Hamara Hai (1959) - Hiralal's wife
 Barkha (1959) - Mrs. Haridas
 Maa Baap (1960) - Raju's Mother
 Kanoon (1960) - Kalidash's Wife
 Bewaqoof (1960) - Mrs. Leela Rai Bahadur
 Parakh (1960) - Mrs. Nivaran
 Kohinoor (1960)
 Kala Bazar (1960) - Raghuvir's Mother
 Hum Hindustani (1960) - Savitri Nath
 Ghunghat (1960) - Laxmi's Mother
 Mehlon Ke Khwab (1960)
 Apna Haath Jagannath (1960) - Lajwanti Malhotra
 Dharmputra (1961) - Meena's mother
 Aas Ka Panchhi (1961) - Mrs. Nihalchand Khanna
 Ram Lila (1961)
 Kanch Ki Gudiya (1961) - Raju's Mother
 Hum Dono (1961) - Anand's Mother
 Gunga Jumna (1961) - Govindi
 Char Diwari (1961) - Sunil's mother
 Batwara (1961) - Suhagan / Suhagi
 Naag Devata (1962)
 Man-Mauji (1962) - Bhagwanti
 Dr. Vidya (1962)
 Prem Andhala Asta (1962)
 Asli-Naqli (1962) - Renu's mother
 Aashiq (1962) - Mrs. Amar Singh
 Dil Hi To Hai (1963) - Nanny / Yusuf's foster mother
 Pahu Re Kiti Vaat (1963)
 Suhagan (1964) - Uma & Vijay Kumar's mother
 Dosti (1964) - Mrs. Gupta
 Zindagi (1964) - Beena's mother
 Shehnai (1964) - Grandmother
 Punar Milan (1964) - Sonal's mother
 Pooja Ke Phool (1964) - Mrs. Singh (Balam's Mother)
 Aap Ki Parchhaiyan (1964) - Mrs. Dinanath Chopra
 Guide (1965) - Raju's Mother
 Johar-Mehmood in Goa (1965) - Pandit's Wife
 Waqt (1965) - Mrs. Mittal
 Nai Umar Ki Nai Fasal (1965)
 Mohabbat Isko Kahete Hain (1965) - Leela
 Faraar (1965) - Mrs. Choudhry
 Phool Aur Patthar (1966) - Blind Beggar
 Aurat (1967) - Parvati's Mom
 Majhli Didi (1967) - Kishan's Mother
 Gunahon Ka Devta (1967)
 Dulhan Ek Raat Ki (1967) - Nirmala's mother
 The Killers (1969)
 Rambhakta Hunuman (1969)
 Prince (1969) - Mrs. Shanti Singh
 Intaquam (1969) - Mrs. Mehra
 Badi Didi (1969) - Mother
 Man Ki Aankhen (1970) - Mrs. Dinanath
 Jeevan Mrityu (1970) - Ashok's Mother
 Bhai-Bhai (1970) - Radha
 Mehmaan (1973) - Rajesh's mother
 Palkon Ki Chhaon Mein (1977)
 Satyam Shivam Sundaram: Love Sublime (1978) - Bade Babu's Wife
 Janta Hawaldar (1979) - Naani
 Aangan Ki Kali (1979)
 Takkar (1980) - Ganga & Pritam's Mother
 Bin Maa Ke Bachche (1980)
  Ramu To Diwana Hai (1980)
 Dil Tujhko Diya (1987) - Mrs. Sahni (final film role)

Director
 Aaj ki Baat (1955)

Producer
 Aaj ki Baat (1955)
 Kisise Na Kehna'' (1942)

References

External links 

1909 births
2003 deaths
Actresses in Hindi cinema
20th-century Indian actresses
Actresses from Karnataka
People from Dharwad district
Indian stage actresses
Actresses in Kannada theatre
Indian women film directors
20th-century Indian film directors
Kannada film directors
Indian women film producers
Kannada film producers
Film directors from Karnataka
Film producers from Karnataka
Indian film actresses
Businesswomen from Karnataka